Joe Gaetani is a paralympic athlete from the United States competing mainly in category TS1 sprint events.

Joe competed in the 1992 Summer Paralympics where he broke the world record in the 100m and 200m to win both gold medals and was part of the American  team that finished 0.02 seconds behind the world record setting Australian team.

References

External links 
 

Athletes (track and field) at the 1992 Summer Paralympics
Paralympic gold medalists for the United States
Paralympic silver medalists for the United States
American male sprinters
Living people
Paralympic track and field athletes of the United States
Year of birth missing (living people)
Medalists at the 1992 Summer Paralympics
Paralympic medalists in athletics (track and field)
Sprinters with limb difference
Paralympic sprinters